Carphochaete schaffneri is a species of Mexican flowering plants in the family Asteraceae. They are native to San Luis Potosí in northeastern Mexico.

References

Eupatorieae
Flora of San Luis Potosí
Plants described in 1904